St. George's School is an independent boarding and day university-preparatory school for boys in the Dunbar area of Vancouver, British Columbia.

History 

St. George's was founded in 1931 by Captain F.J. Danby-Hunter.

The original school operated out of a large country manor house. It has since expanded, and the school now maintains two campuses; the Senior School, on land leased from UBC in 1925, and the Junior School, converted from the former Convent of the Sacred Heart, a historic property purchased in 1979, which had formerly served as a Catholic all-girls school.

Students 
The student body at St. George's comprises 1,151 students from 22 countries, with approximately 750 at the Senior School and the remainder in the Junior School. As of June 2016, 109 students were boarding students. Like other independent schools, it maintains a system of prefects and mandates the wearing of uniforms. The school captain and other prefects are elected by the faculty and their fellow students to provide the school with student leaders.

Athletics 

Sports is a major part of the student experience at St. George's School. Approximately 80% of students play in a competitive team. To encourage students to live a healthy life and build character, the school mandates that its boys select a recreational or competitive sport starting from Grade 8. Boys in Grades 11–12 may opt out for one term based on past games attendance.

St. George's has a wide variety of sports teams, including:

 Badminton
 Basketball
 Cricket
 Cross country running
 Curling
 Downhill Skiing
 Snowboarding
 Volleyball
 Field Hockey
 Golf
 Ice hockey
 Rugby
 Ultimate
 Rowing
 Soccer
 Squash
 Swimming
 Table Tennis
 Track and Field
 Triathlon
 Tennis
 Water polo
 Rock Climbing

Outdoor education 
There is also a mandatory outdoor education program implemented for students from grades 1-10. Students are required to participate in outdoor educational programs both in the junior school and the senior school. These activities range from half day trips (grade 1) to full, week-long excursions (grade 10). The junior experiences focus on an education aspect: students learn about First Nations peoples and about the environment. The senior trips involve more personal-based learning; activities in the wilderness such as hiking, kayaking and canoeing focus on leadership and interpersonal skills. There is also a focus on environmental care and education. In grade 10, students have the option of applying for the 'Discovery 10' cohort program. This program is limited to 20 students who participate in a modified Social Studies and PE program, focusing on First Nations history, environmental studies, and outdoor leadership. The students spend approximately 55 days of each school year out of class on outdoor-education trips (hiking, canoeing, kayaking, rock-climbing).

Clubs and activities 

The school offers a variety of extra-curricular clubs:

 Amnesty International
 Anime Comics and Games Club
 Art Club
 Athletic Trainers
 Beekeeping and Organic Gardening
 Book Club
 Brass Ensemble
 Business
 Jazz Combo
 Ceramics
 Chinese Culture Club
 Debate Club
 Destination Imagination
 History Club
 Gender and Sexuality Alliance
 Improv
 Jazz Band
  Investment Club
 Maker Club
 Math
 Model United Nations (MUN)
 Robotics
 Wood Working
 Percussion Ensemble
 Photography
 Guitar
 Language clubs (Russian, German, Japanese, Mandarin)
 Saints Sprouts
 Saints Stylus
 Green Machine
 Georgian Yearbook
 STEM Club
 Wind Ensemble

Students publish a school yearbook—the Georgian, a magazine—the Saint, as well as a literary and artistic journal—the Opus. There are also various student-organized events such as music nights, socials, and mixers with sister schools Crofton House and York House.

Notable alumni

References

Notes 
 The junior school campus (Convent of the Sacred Heart) is a heritage site.
 St. George's "sister" schools are York House School in Vancouver BC, St. Margaret's School in Victoria BC and Crofton House School, also in Vancouver.
 The school has a rivalry with Vancouver College; for example, the Saints' and VC rowing crews compete annually in a regatta in April, the "Saints College Boat Race".

External links 
 
 St. George's Summer Camps
 St. George's School Profile By OurKids.net: Canada's Private School Guide

Boys' schools in Canada
Boarding schools in British Columbia
Private schools in British Columbia
High schools in Vancouver
Elementary schools in Vancouver
Gothic Revival architecture in Vancouver
Educational institutions established in 1930
1930 establishments in British Columbia